Pennsylvania Railroad 3750 is a 4-6-2 "Pacific" type steam locomotive located at the Railroad Museum of Pennsylvania, just outside Strasburg, Pennsylvania in the United States. For over a decade, the No. 3750 locomotive stood-in for the prototype K4, No. 1737, and was listed on the National Register of Historic Places in 1979. It was one of two surviving K4 locomotives, along with No. 1361, both designated as the official state steam locomotive by the Pennsylvania General Assembly in 1987.

History 

PRR 3750 was used to haul the Pennsylvania Railroad's mainline passenger trains such as the Broadway Limited. Despite the attempt by railroad management to replace the K4s with the K5 and T1, the K4s would remain in action until final dieselization in 1957. The 3750 was spared from being scrapped because, when the Pennsylvania Railroad was considering steam engines for preservation, the first K4s, 1737, built in 1914, had deteriorated to the point that it was not worth preserving.  The Pennsylvania decided to scrap No. 1737 and use the No. 3750 locomotive as a stand-in with the original number plates and tender from No. 1737.

In 1921, 3750 headed up soon-to-be President Warren G. Harding's campaign train. Three years later, it also was one of the locomotives that pulled Harding's funeral train.

When the steam power era ended, most railroads scrapped their locomotives.  The PRR, however, took pride in its engineering and mechanical legacy. PRR historian Dan Cupper gives much credit to a former Chief of Motive Power for the initiative to preserve examples of its most-successful engines at its Northumberland, Pennsylvania roundhouse. In 1975, PRR 3750 was moved to the Railroad Museum of Pennsylvania in Strasburg, Pennsylvania. The entire PRR collection came under threat in the 1980s when the PRR's successor, the Penn Central estate, sought to raise cash by selling it for scrap. The Pennsylvania Legislature intervened, and forgave some back taxes in exchange for PC deeding the collection to the state. The entire collection is now (2022) at the Strasburg museum. 

The Pennsylvania General Assembly designated 3750 and 1361 the official state steam locomotives on December 18, 1987, while also designating GG1 No. 4859 as the state electric locomotive in the same bill.

The No. 3750 locomotive currently sits on outdoor display at the Railroad Museum of Pennsylvania, just outside Strasburg, Pennsylvania, exposed to the elements. The museum's volunteer group plans to have the locomotive cosmetically-restored prior to it being placed in a planned roundhouse.

See also 
 List of Pennsylvania state symbols
 National Register of Historic Places listings in Lancaster County, Pennsylvania

References

Sources 
 

4-6-2 locomotives
Individual locomotives of the United States
3750
Railway locomotives on the National Register of Historic Places in Pennsylvania
Symbols of Pennsylvania
Collection of the Railroad Museum of Pennsylvania
Standard gauge locomotives of the United States
National Register of Historic Places in Lancaster County, Pennsylvania
Preserved steam locomotives of Pennsylvania